Mitchelton is a north-western suburb in the City of Brisbane, Queensland, Australia.

Geography
Mitchelton is part of the northwestern suburbs. It is a growing suburb with many Queenslander style houses and leafy streets. The area is quite hilly and most of the suburb is on a north-facing slope.

History
Mitchelton is an area with a long history. Mitchelton's name comes from one particular family of the first settlers in the area. The Mitchell family emigrated from England in the 1850s. Nicholas Mitchell purchased an estate he named "Mitchelton" by 1875. This area was first subdivided in the 1890s.

St Matthews Church of England was built from 1867 to 1869. The church and its cemetery are at 35 Church Road. It was designed by Charles Tiffin.

On 4 October 1913, Arthur Blackwood sold a large portion of land known as the Oxford Park Estate between Samford Road and Kedron Brook. It was a subdivision of 300 suburban allotments (mostly 32 perches) and 8 larger farm allotments on St Helens Road fronting Kedron Brook. The estate created Blackwood Street and University Road (the northern part of which is now Pascoe Road). One of the advertised benefits of the estate were its  proximity to the proposed Groveley railway station on the Ferny Grove railway line. The estate gave its name to the Oxford Park railway station, despite the railway station being to the west of the estate, which resulted in land near that railway station being commonly known as Oxford Park (although that land never formed part of the Oxford Park subdivision).

Grovely State School opened on 9 October 1916. It was renamed Mitchelton State School in 1923. (It is not to be confused with the present day Grovely State School in Keperra, which opened in 1956).

In June 1922, Grovely Lodge Estate, 3rd section, made up of 149 residential sites and 4 large blocks, were advertised by Cameron Bros Auctioneers. A map advertising the auction states that the estate is 5 minutes walk to both Mitchelton railway station and state school.

The first section of Mitchelton View Estate was offered for sale in 1926 by B.F. Caniffe. In May 1933, B.F. Caniffe auctioned 50 suburban blocks, the third section of the Mitchelton View Estate. The subdivision was bounded by Gizerah Street, Taylors Road, Frasers Road and Mashobra Street. However, the bidding did not reach the reserve price and the blocks were not sold.

In 1930 the Sisters of the Good Shepherd established the Good Shepherd Home for girls with special needs or those deemed to be "uncontrollable" in their own homes; these girls worked in the home's commercial laundry. The home was closed in late 1974 due to changes in community and government expectations about institutionalised care of children.

in January 1949 the Sisters of the Good Samaritan opened Our Lady of Dolours Catholic School at the request of James Duhig, the Roman Catholic Archbishop of Brisbane, with 69 students and two sisters as teachers.

Mitchelton Infants State School opened on 29 January 1952; it closed 1 January 1986.

Mitchelton State High School opened on 31 January 1956.

All Souls' Anglican church was dedicated on 26 March 1961 by Archbishop Halse and consecrated on 9 March 1975 by Archbishop Arnott. Its closure was approved circa 1986. It was located at 10 Tel El Kebir Street on the corner of Heliopolis Parade. As at 2020, the building is used as a child care centre.

Mt Maria College was established in Mitchelton in 1979 by amalgamating Years 11 and 12 of Marcellin College (a Catholic boys school in Enoggera) with St Benedict's College (a Catholic girls school in Wilston). It occupied the former Good Shepherd Home.

Mitchelton State Special School opened on 17 May 1971.

The current Mitchelton Public Library opened in 1983 and had a major refurbishment in 2013.

The median age of the Mitchelton population was 36 years of age, 2 years below the Australian median. 78.3% of people living in Mitchelton were born in Australia, compared to the national average of 66.7%; the next most common countries of birth were England 3.8%, New Zealand 2.6%, India 1.1%, South Africa 0.8%, United States of America 0.7%. 87.4% of people spoke only English at home; the next most common languages were Mandarin 0.9%, Spanish 0.8%, German 0.5%, Japanese 0.5%, French 0.4%.

Heritage listings

Mitchelton has a number of heritage-listed sites, including:

 35 Church Road: St Matthews Anglican Church, Grovely
 46 Church Road: former Redemptorist Monastery
 10 Corvi Street: Residence
 47 Glen Retreat Road: Mitchelton State School
 67 Osborne Road: Good Shepherd Home, Mt Maria College
 Samford Road (opposite Suez Street): Bus shelter
 543 Samford Road: former Police Station
 600 Samford Road: Our Lady of Dolours Church
 671 Samford Road: former Mitchelton Infants School
 71 St Helens Road: Residence

Education 
Mitchelton is home to numerous schools, which include Mitchelton State School, Mitchelton State High School, Mitchelton Special School, Our Lady of Dolours Primary School and Mt Maria College, which is based in the old Sisters of the Good Shepherd home for troubled girls.

Mitchelton State School is a government primary (Prep–6) school for boys and girls at 47 Glen Retreat Road. In 2017, the school had an enrolment of 469 students with 39 teachers (29 full-time equivalent) and 29 non-teaching staff (15 full-time equivalent). It includes a special education program.

Mitchelton State High School is a government secondary (7–12) school for boys and girls at 754 Samford Road. In 2017, the school had an enrolment of 445 students with 56 teachers (52 full-time equivalent) and 37 non-teaching staff (25 full-time equivalent). It includes a special education program.

Mitchelton Special School is a special primary and secondary (Early Childhood–12) school for boys and girls at Kedron Avenue. In 2017, the school had an enrolment of 145 students with 44 teachers (37 full-time equivalent) and 52 non-teaching staff (31 full-time equivalent).

Our Lady of Dolours School is a Catholic primary (Prep–6) school for boys and girls at 2 Willcocks Street. In 2017, the school had an enrolment of 190 students with 16 teachers (13 full-time equivalent) and 11 non-teaching staff (6 full-time equivalent).

Mt Maria College is a Catholic secondary (7–12) school for boys and girls at 54 Prospect Road. In 2017, the school had an enrolment of 945 students with 72 teachers (69 full-time equivalent) and 52 non-teaching staff (38 full-time equivalent).

Facilities 
Mitchelton is now filled with many shops, schools and facilities, such as the Brookside Shopping Centre, and a very attractive shopping district on Blackwood Avenue that also features a monthly market which attracts many vendors of fine foods and wares as well as tourists. Mitchelton is also home to many sporting teams in state competition.

Mitchelton Football club, located in Teralba Park on Osborne road is celebrating its 100th anniversary in 2020.  The original team was called the Black Diamonds, and had distinctive uniforms in white with a black diamond on the shirt.  The black diamonds were also one of the first teams in the Brisbane area that had aborigines on the team.  Of note, the internationally famous singing group, the Bee Gees, Barry, Robin and Maurice Gibb, performed at the Mitchelton Soccer Club Trophy Night in 1960 before they shot to stardom.

The Brisbane City Council operates a public library in Mitchelton at 37 Heliopolis Parade.

Transport
Via train, Oxford Park Railway Station and Mitchelton Railway Station provide access to regular Queensland Rail City network services on the Ferny Grove railway line arranging travel to the Brisbane CBD, Beenleigh and Ferny Grove.

Via bus, Mitchelton is served by Brisbane Transport buses to the Brisbane CBD, Chermside, Toowong and Ferny Grove.

Via road, Mitchelton's main arterials are Samford Road, which is the main corridor for motorists travelling to The City and Samford, as well as Osborne Road which is the main corridor for motorists travelling to the outer Northern suburbs such as Aspley.

Via bikeway, Mitchelton has direct access to the Kedron Brook bikeway which leads all the way to the coast over 20 km away and passes many vistas along the way.

Notable people
Notable people from or having lived in Mitchelton include:
 Colin Davidson, Australian Army officer, Medal of Freedom

References

External links

 University of Queensland: Queensland Places: Mitchelton
 
 
 

 
Suburbs of the City of Brisbane